

Election result

A total of 67,970 votes were cast. There were 508 spoiled ballots. The turnout was 34.79%
The 2014 Rotherham Metropolitan Borough Council election took place on 22 May 2014 to elect members of Rotherham Metropolitan Borough Council in England. This was on the same day as other local elections.

A third of the seats was in play. The councilmen and women from this class were previously elected during the 2010 Rotherham Council election, in which Labour swept 19 out of 21 wards with 44% of the votes, thanks to the very divided opposition (Conservative, UKIP, BNP as well as Independents).

This was the first election since the Rotherham child sexual exploitation scandal broke. Turnout lowered to about half of its 2010 figure (down to 34.79%). UKIP made huge gains, taking 10 of the 21 seats in play, their first ever at the Council.

Opposition to Labour is up to the levels of 2007, but Labour's majority on the Council is still safe despite being reduced from 58 to 50 (out of 63).

Council Composition
Prior to the election the composition of the council was:

After the election the composition of the council was:

References

External links
Results from the Rotherham MBC website 

2014 English local elections
2014
2010s in South Yorkshire